Hisonotus ringueleti is a species of catfish in the family Loricariidae. It is native to South America, where it occurs in the Uruguay River basin. It is found mainly in vegetated areas inhabited by species belonging to the plant genera Ludwigia and Potamogeton, among others. It occurs in both slow and fast-flowing clear creek environments with a substrate of stones, mud, or gravel. The species reaches 4.3 cm (1.7 inches) SL.

References 

Otothyrinae
Fish described in 2001